Tine Kristin Jensen (born 1957) is a Norwegian psychologist. She is a Professor of Psychology at the University of Oslo and a Research Professor at the Norwegian Centre for Violence and Traumatic Stress Studies. Jensen is an expert on children and psychological trauma, developmental psychology, and treatment studies. Her research has focused on e.g. sexually abused children, how Norwegian parents and children coped with the 2004 Indian Ocean earthquake and tsunami, adolescents who survived the Utøya massacre and their families, young unaccompanied asylum seekers and treatment of traumatized children.

She has a candidata psychologiae degree from the University of Oslo (1986), a doctoral degree from the same university (2005), and is a specialist in clinical psychology.

References

External links

1957 births
Living people
Norwegian psychologists
Norwegian women psychologists
University of Oslo alumni
Academic staff of the University of Oslo
Norwegian Centre for Violence and Traumatic Stress Studies people
21st-century women scientists